Fate of the Banished is a novel by Ugandan author Julius Ocwinyo. It was first published in 1997 by Fountain Publishers.

Plot
The story centres on Father Santos Dila – the embodiment of Christian virtue, having trained from the Gregorian University in Italy, and who is now the parish priest. Father Santos falls in love with Flo, the wife of a rebel. It is set in a war torn area, the characters are furious, bitter and are ready to act with little remorse in the face of mischief against them or provocation. When Father Santos gets involved with Flo, he puts his life on the line. The story involves an investigation of whether the cleric was fully prepared by his priestly training to resist any temptation from the beautiful sister. Apire, Flo's husband,  returns from the bush to find his wife with father Santos. He executes both of them and hands himself over to the Police.
The book follows Apire, Flo and Father Santos.

Critical reception
Africa book club called it "a book with a powerful story, narrated excellently with prose that is filled with anecdotes and images of everyday conversation".

Awards and recognition
Won the 1997 Uganda Publishers and Booksellers Association (UPABA) award for best adult fiction.
Selected as one of the study texts for the A-level Literature syllabus in Uganda.

References 

1997 novels
Ugandan novels
Postcolonial novels
Kumusha
1997 debut novels
1997 in Uganda